Andrew Knapper (born 2 September 1981) is an English international lawn bowler.

Bowls career
He competed for England in both the men's fours and the men's pairs events at the 2014 Commonwealth Games where he won a silver and bronze medal respectively.  In 2015 he won the triples bronze medal at the Atlantic Bowls Championships.

In 2016 he was part of the triples team with Robert Paxton and Jamie Walker who won the gold medal at 2016 World Outdoor Bowls Championship in Christchurch.

He won the National Championship triples in 2013 and 2019.

In 2020 he was selected for the 2020 World Outdoor Bowls Championship in Australia.

References

1981 births
Living people
Bowls players at the 2014 Commonwealth Games
Commonwealth Games silver medallists for England
Commonwealth Games bronze medallists for England
English male bowls players
Commonwealth Games medallists in lawn bowls
Bowls World Champions
Medallists at the 2014 Commonwealth Games